Évora is a city and a municipality in Portugal. It has 53,591 inhabitants (2021), in an area of 1307.08 km2. It is the historic capital of the Alentejo and serves as the seat of the Évora District.

Due to its well-preserved old town centre, still partially enclosed by medieval walls, and many monuments dating from various historical periods, including a Roman Temple, Évora is a UNESCO World Heritage Site.

Due to its inland position, Évora is one of Portugal's hottest cities in the summer, frequently subject to heat waves.

Évora is ranked number two in the Portuguese most livable cities survey of living conditions published yearly by Expresso. It was ranked first in a study concerning competitiveness of the 18 Portuguese district capitals, according to a 2006 study made by Minho University economics researchers.

Along with Liepāja, Latvia, Évora was chosen to be European Capital of Culture in 2027.

History

Early history 
Évora has a history dating back more than five millennia.

It was known as Ebora by the Celtici, a tribal confederacy, south of the Lusitanians (and of Tagus river), who made the town their regional capital.

The etymological origin of the name Ebora is from the ancient Celtic word ebora/ebura, the genitive plural form of the word eburos (yew), the name of a species of tree, so its name means "of the yew trees." The city of York, in northern England, at the time of the Roman Empire, was called Eboracum/Eburacum, after the ancient Celtic place name *Eborakon (Place of Yew Trees), so the old name of York is etymologically related to the city of Évora. Alternative hypotheses are that the name is derived from oro, aurum, (gold)  as the Romans had extensive gold mining in Portugal; or it may have been named after ivory workers because ebur (genitive eboris) was Latin for ivory.
It may have been capital of the kingdom of Astolpas.

Roman rule 
See Ebora Liberalitas Julia for more on Roman Évora.

The Romans conquered the town in 57 BC and expanded it into a walled town. Vestiges from this period (city walls and ruins of Roman baths) remain.
Julius Caesar called it Liberalitas Julia (Julian generosity). The city grew in importance because it lay at the junction of several important routes. During his travels through Gaul and Lusitania, Pliny the Elder also visited this town and mentioned it in his book Naturalis Historia as Ebora Cerealis, because of its many surrounding wheat fields. In those days, Évora became a flourishing city. Its high rank among municipalities in Roman Hispania is clearly shown by many inscriptions and coins. The monumental Corinthian temple in the centre of the town dates from the first century and was probably erected in honour of emperor Augustus. In the fourth century, the town had already a bishop, named Quintianus.

During the barbarian invasions, Évora came under the rule of the Visigothic king Leovigild in 584. The town was later raised to the status of a cathedral city. Nevertheless, this was a time of decline and very few artifacts from this period remain.

Moorish rule 
In 715, the city was conquered by the Moors under Tariq ibn-Ziyad. During the Moorish rule (715–1165), the town, part of the Taifa of Badajoz, slowly began to prosper again and developed into an agricultural center with a fortress and a mosque. The Moorish influence can still be observed in the character of the historical city. During that time, several notables hailed from Évora, including Abd al-Majid ibn Abdun Al-Yaburi عبد المجيد بن عبدون اليابري, a poet whose diwan still survives to this day.

Reconquest 
Évora was wrested from the Moors through a surprise attack by Gerald the Fearless (Geraldo Sem Pavor) in September 1165. The town came under the rule of the Portuguese king Afonso I in 1166. It then flourished as one of the most dynamic cities in the Kingdom of Portugal during the Middle Ages, especially in the 15th century. The court of the first and second dynasties resided here for long periods, constructing palaces, monuments, and religious buildings. Évora became the scene for many royal weddings and a site where many important decisions were made.

Manueline favour 

Particularly thriving during the Avis Dynasty (1385–1580), especially under the reign of Manuel I and John III, Évora became a major centre for the humanities (André de Resende - buried in the cathedral) and artists, such as the sculptor Nicolau Chanterene; the painters Cristóvão de Figueiredo and Gregório Lopes; the composers Manuel Cardoso and Duarte Lobo; the chronicler Duarte Galvão; and the father of Portuguese drama, Gil Vicente.

Évora also held a large part of the slave population of Portugal. Nicolas Clenard, a Flemish tutor at the Portuguese court, exclaimed in 1535 that "In Évora, it was as if I had been carried off to a city in hell: everywhere I only meet blacks."

The city became the seat of an archbishopric in 1540. The university was founded by the Jesuits in 1559, and it was here that great European Masters such as the Flemish humanists Nicolaus Clenardus (Nicolaas Cleynaerts) (1493–1542), Johannes Vasaeus (Jan Was) (1511–1561) and the theologian Luis de Molina passed on their knowledge. In the 18th century, the Jesuits, who had spread intellectual and religious enlightenment since the 16th century, were expelled from Portugal, the university was closed in 1759 by the Marquis of Pombal, and Évora went into decline. The university was only reopened in 1973.

Recent history 

The Battle of Évora was fought on 29 July 1808 during the Peninsular War. An outnumbered Portuguese-Spanish force of 2,500, assisted by poorly armed peasant militiamen, tried to stop a French-Spanish division commanded by Louis Henri Loison but it was routed. Led by the hated Loison, known as Maneta or One-Hand, the French went on to storm the town which was defended by soldiers, militiamen, and armed townsmen. Breaking into the town, the attackers slaughtered combatants and non-combatants alike before thoroughly pillaging the place. The French invasion inflicted as many as 8,000 casualties while suffering only 290 of their own.

In 1834, Évora was the site of the surrender of the forces of King Miguel I, which marked the end of the Liberal Wars. The many monuments erected by major artists of each period now testify to Évora's lively cultural and rich artistic and historical heritage. The variety of architectural styles (Romanesque, Gothic, Manueline, Renaissance, Baroque), the palaces and the picturesque labyrinth of squares and narrow streets of the city centre are all part of the rich heritage of this museum-city.

In 1909, the city was damaged by an earthquake.

Geography

Physical geography
Évora (altitude 300m) is situated in Alentejo, a large region of wide plains in the south of Portugal, bordered to the North by the Tagus River and to the South by the region of Algarve. It is the chief city of the region. 

The seat of the municipality is the city of Évora, composed by the civil parishes of Évora (São Mamede, Sé, São Pedro e Santo Antão) in the historical centre and the urban parishes of Bacelo e Senhora da Saúde and Malagueira e Horta das Figueiras outside the ancient city walls where most of the population in fact reside. The remaining civil parishes in the municipality are rural or suburban and do not form part of the city for statistical purposes.

Climate
Évora has a hot-summer Mediterranean climate (Köppen: Csa) with hot, dry summers and mild, moist winters. Its location in the interior of southern Portugal makes it subject to frequent droughts and desertification. This is due to low-scale maritime effects caused by its relative proximity to the Atlantic Ocean, which also causes seasonal lag predominantly during the warmer period, with night-time temperatures being milder in September than June as well as in October compared with May. Frosts in winter are frequent but not usually severe, snow falling only twice a decade.

Human geography

Évora is a pleasant medium-sized city and has numerous monuments. Due to its long history, monuments and buildings are its main attraction to outsiders. However, there are numerous "Festas Populares" celebrating saints, holidays, "Feiras" (fairs) and cultural events (such as televised musical presentations) sponsored by the municipality and other organizations

The present Mayor is Carlos Pinto de Sá of the CDU coalition. The municipal holiday is 29 June.
The municipality consists of the following 12 civil parishes:

 Bacelo e Senhora da Saúde
 Canaviais
 Évora (São Mamede, Sé, São Pedro e Santo Antão)
 Malagueira e Horta das Figueiras
 Nossa Senhora da Graça do Divor
 Nossa Senhora da Tourega e Nossa Senhora de Guadalupe
 Nossa Senhora de Machede
 São Bento do Mato
 São Manços e São Vicente do Pigeiro
 São Miguel de Machede
 São Sebastião da Giesteira e Nossa Senhora da Boa Fé
 Torre de Coelheiros

International relations

Évora is twinned with:

 Angra do Heroísmo, Portugal, since 1986
 Chartres, France, since 2003
 Qazvin, Iran, since 2016
 Island of Mozambique, Mozambique, since 1997
 Suzdal, Russia, since 1986

Economy

Évora is the chief city of the Alentejo region, and plays a role as an important agricultural and services center. It is home to several institutions with great importance for the region, like the state-run University of Évora and the district hospital.

In 2015, Embraer built two factories for the production of aircraft parts along with its European Engineering Center. In 2022, these factories were sold to aerospace company Aernnova, a corporate spin-off of Siemens Gamesa.

Due to its extensive historical and cultural importance, Évora, as well as the surrounding area, saw in the 2010s a great increase in its international tourism sector, which fomented the creation of many hotels, bed-and-breakfasts and various other styles of accommodation. Some of its most visited sites include the Roman Temple of Évora, the Chapel of Bones, the Cathedral of Évora, Évora's Museum, and its historical centre.

Transport
Évora can be reached by bus or train. This single-track electrified line is mainly intended for freight traffic, but would also carry some passenger trains, with speeds up to 250 km/h.

There is a small airfield, the Évora Municipal Airport, currently without commercial airline service. The closest major airports are: Beja, Lisbon, Faro and Badajoz.

Architecture

Prehistoric
 Cromeleque dos Almendres,  from Évora: Megalithic monument, a cromlech with archaeoastronomical interest.

Civic

The city of Évora is marked by the historic square in the Praça do Geraldo, where King Duarte constructed the Estaus Palace. The square is marked by the Henriquina fountain, dating to 1570, which includes eight jets symbolizing the eight streets that lead to the square. At the northern end of the square is the Church of Saint Andrew built by Manuel Pires, in the 16th century. A rather large church three-nave church includes a valuable altar antependium from the 13th century in bas relief. In 1483, Fernando II, the Duke of Braganza was executed in the square, in the presence of his brother-in-law king John II. This square also witnessed thousands of autos-da-fé during the Inquisition; there were 22000 condemnations, during the course of 200 years.
 Fountain of Portas de Moura, the Renaissance fountain (located in the Largo das Portas de Moura) was built in 1556, and an original design that includes globe surrounded by water (referencing the Age of Discovery).
 Holy Spirit College of the Order of Christ, today a nucleus of the University of Évora, the former Jesuit college was ordered constructed by Cardinal-King Henrique in 1559, and includes 16th century Mannerist elements, in addition to academic buildings constructed between the 17th-18th century (including cloister).
 Royal Palace of Évora: Remnants of a palace built by King Manuel I in Gothic-Renaissance style. According to some chroniclers, it was in this palace, in 1497, that Vasco da Gama was given the command of the squadron he would lead on his maritime journey to India.
 Palace of the Counts of Basto, a primitive Moorish castle and later residence of the Afonsine dynastic kings. Its outer architecture displays features of Gothic, Manueline, Mudéjar and Renaissance styles.
 Palace of the Dukes of Cadaval, a 17th-century palace, built from the remains of an old castle (burnt down in 1384), and later serving as Governors and Royal residences. The palace includes Manueline-Moorish architectural elements (including the Tower of the Five Shields), and whose first-floor houses a collection of manuscripts, family portraits, and religious art from the 16th century.
 Prata Aqueduct, designed by military architect Francisco de Arruda (who previously designed the Belém Tower, it was built during the reign of by King João III between 1531 and 1537, the huge arches which stretched  to supply water from the interior to Évora. Originally, the aqueduct ended in the Praça do Giraldo, and bisected the city, resulting in the construction of houses, shops, and cafés built between the arches (such as in the areas of Rua da Cano, Travessa das Nunes and Rua do Salvador street). A segment of the Roman wall and foundations of period buildings are preserved along Travessa Alcárcova de Cima, a narrow lane in the historic center. This structure was mentioned in the epic poem Os Lusíadas by Luís de Camões.

 Roman Temple of Évora, improperly referred to as the Temple of Diana, was a 1st-century (in some references 2nd or 3rd century) temple, dedicated to the cult of Emperor Augustus, that was incorporated into mediaeval building and, thus, survived destruction. Évora's most famous landmark, it is constructed of  Corinthian columns  and fourteen granite columns, and whose base, capitals and the architraves of marble excavated from Estremoz.

Religious
 Cathedral of Évora: Mainly built between 1280 and 1340, it is one of the most important gothic monuments of Portugal. The cathedral has a notable main portal with statues of the Apostles (around 1335) and a beautiful nave and cloister. One transept chapel is Manueline and the outstanding main chapel is Baroque. The pipe organ and choir stalls are renaissance (around 1566).
 Chapel of São Brás Built around 1480, it is a good example of Mudéjar-Gothic with cylindrical buttresses. Only open for prayer.
 Saint Francis Church (Igreja de São Francisco): Built between the end of the 15th and the early 16th centuries in mixed Gothic-Manueline styles. The wide nave is a masterpiece of late Gothic architecture. Contains many chapels decorated in Baroque style, including the Chapel of Bones (Capela dos Ossos), totally covered with human bones.
 Lóios Convent and Church: Built in the 15th century, contains a number of tombs; the church and the cloister are Gothic in style, with a Manueline chapterhouse with a magnificent portal. The church interior is covered in azulejos (ceramic tiles) from the 18th century. In 1965 it was converted into an upmarket pousada.

Notable people

Historical

 Abd al-Majid ibn Abdun (c. 1050–1135 in Évora) was a poet from Al-Andalus
 Maria of Portugal (1342–1375) a Portuguese infanta (princess), first daughter of King Peter I
 Garcia de Resende (1470–1536) a Portuguese poet and editor. He served King John II as a page and private secretary
 Miguel da Silva (c. 1480–1556) a Portuguese nobleman, appointed by King Manuel I as ambassador to Rome in 1514
 André de Resende (1498–1573) a Dominican friar, father of archaeology in Portugal
 Cristóvão da Gama (c. 1516–1542) a Portuguese military commander who led a Portuguese army of 400 musketeers on a crusade in Ethiopia and Somalia
 Gaspar da Cruz (c. 1520–1570) a Portuguese Dominican friar who traveled to Asia and wrote one of the first detailed European accounts about China.
 João Manuel, Prince of Portugal (1537–1554) a Portuguese infante (prince), the eighth son of King John III
 Luís Mendes de Vasconcellos (c. 1542–1623) a Portuguese nobleman, colonial Governor of Angola and 55th Grand Master of the Order of Saint John
 Pedro Fernandes de Queirós (1565–1614) a Portuguese navigator in the service of Spain, known for the Spanish voyages of discovery in the Pacific Ocean
 João dos Santos (Évora – Goa 1622) a Dominican missionary in India and Africa
 Estevão Brioso de Figueiredo (1630–1689) a Roman Catholic prelate, served as Bishop of Funchal (1683–1689) and the first Bishop of Olinda (1676–1683)
 José Ribeiro da Fonseca (1690–1752) a Portuguese Franciscan, became Bishop of Porto
 Joaquim Heliodoro da Cunha Rivara (1809–1879) a Portuguese physician, professor, intellectual and politician

Recent times
 Celestino David (1880–1952) a Portuguese writer, made honorary citizen of Évora.
 Túlio Espanca, (Wiki PT) (1913-1993) a Portuguese historian who significantly contributed to the cultural and artistic history of Évora and the Alentejo
 José Augusto Alegria, (Wiki PT) (1917–2004) a Portuguese musicologist
 António Marcos Galopim de Carvalho, (Wiki PT) (1931) a Portuguese professor, scientist and writer
 José Cutileiro (born 1934) a Portuguese diplomat and writer
 Vitorino Salomé Vieira (born 1942) a Portuguese singer-songwriter whose music combines the traditional music of Alentejo and urban popular song
 António Livramento (1943–1999) a Portuguese roller hockey player of world renown and coach
 Joaquim Palminha Silva, (Wiki PT) (1945–2015) a Portuguese journalist and historian
 Vítor Norte (born 1951) a Portuguese actor and voice actor 
 Carlos Francisco Carvalho Falé (born 1952) a former Portuguese footballer, played 271 games for Lusitano de Évora
 Hernâni Neves (born 1963) known as Hernâni, is a retired Portuguese football and beach soccer player
 Maria Leal da Costa (born 1964) a Portuguese sculptor, she is developing the Alentejo sculpture park
 João Magueijo (born 1967) a Portuguese cosmologist and professor in Theoretical Physics at Imperial College London
 Orlanda Velez Isidro (born 1972) a Portuguese classically trained coloratura soprano; preferred genre is Renaissance and Baroque repertoire
 Inês Zuber (born 1980) a Portuguese politician, was MEP from 2012 to 2016 for the Portuguese Communist Party
 Carla Matadinho (born 1982) a Portuguese model
 Pedro Rebocho (born 1995) a football player

Gallery

See also

University of Évora
Evora Tambacounda 2004
Évora IPR

References
Notes

Sources
 Turner, J. - Grove Dictionary of Art - Macmillan Publishers Ltd., 1996; 
The Rough Guide to Portugal - 11th edition March 2005 - 
Rentes de Carvalho J. - Portugal, um guia para amigos - In Dutch translation : Portugal - De Arbeiderspers, Amsterdam; ninth edition August 1999

External links

 Town Hall official website
 Évora´s Article by Gina Modesto in Accessible Travel Magazine, October 2007 (Error 404 2009-6-4)
 Map of Évora
 Évora Bilíngue PT/BG
Évora Tourism Office - Évora Tour Guide

 
Cities in Portugal
World Heritage Sites in Portugal
Portugal
Municipalities of Évora District